"Chain Gang" is a song by the American singer-songwriter Sam Cooke, released on July 26, 1960.

Background
This was Cooke's second-biggest American hit, his first hit single for RCA Victor after leaving Keen Records earlier in 1959, and was also his first top 10 hit since "You Send Me" from 1957, and his second-biggest pop single. The song was inspired after a chance meeting with an actual chain gang of prisoners on a highway, seen while Cooke was on tour.

Cooke was reportedly unsatisfied with the initial recording sessions of this song at RCA Studios in Manhattan in January 1960, and came back three months later to redo some of the vocals to get the effect he wanted.

Chart history
The song became one of Cooke's most successful singles, peaking at number two on the Billboard Hot 100, behind both "My Heart Has a Mind of Its Own" by Connie Francis and "Mr. Custer" by Larry Verne On the Hot R&B Sides chart, the song peaked at number two as well. Overseas, "Chain Gang" charted at number nine on the UK Singles Chart, becoming Cooke's first top-ten single there.

Jim Croce medley

Jim Croce had his last Hot 100 hit in 1976 when Lifesong Records released "Chain Gang Medley," a medley which included this song as well as "He Don't Love You (Like I Love You)" and "Searchin'." The medley reached a peak of 63 on the Billboard Hot 100 after spending 9 weeks on the chart.

References

1960 singles
1968 singles
Jackie Wilson songs
Sam Cooke songs
Songs written by Sam Cooke
Jim Croce songs
Songs about prison
Songs about labor
1960 songs
RCA Victor singles
Song recordings produced by Hugo & Luigi